Zuphiini is a tribe of ground beetles in the family Carabidae, found worldwide.

Genera
Zuphiini contains the following 23 genera:

 Acrogenys W.J.MacLeay, 1864
 Agastus Schmidt-Goebel, 1846
 Chaudoirella Mateu, 1982
 Coarazuphium Gnaspini; Vanin & Godoy, 1998
 Colasidia Basilewsky, 1954
 Dicrodontus Chaudoir, 1872
 Gunvorita Landin, 1955
 Ildobates Español, 1966
 Leleupidia Basilewsky, 1951
 Metaxidius Chaudoir, 1852
 Metazuphium Mateu, 1992
 Mischocephalus Chaudoir, 1863
 Neoleleupidia Basilewsky, 1953
 Paraleleupidia Basilewsky, 1951
 Parazuphium Jeannel, 1942
 Planetes W.S.MacLeay, 1825
 Polistichus Bonelli, 1810
 Pseudaptinus Laporte, 1834
 Speothalpius B.Moore, 1995
 Speozuphium B.Moore, 1995
 Typhlozuphium Baehr, 2014
 Zuphioides Ball & Shpeley, 2013
 Zuphium Latreille, 1805

References

External links

 

Harpalinae
Articles created by Qbugbot